Gombos may refer to:

People
Ferenc Gömbös (1944-2003) Hungarian dentist and politician
Gyula Gömbös (1886-1936) Hungarian military officer, politician and Prime Minister
Károly Gombos (1981) Hungarian cross-country skier and biathlete
Norbert Gomboš (1990) Slovak tennis player of Hungarian descent
Sándor Gombos (1895-1968) Hungarian Olympic champion fencer
Stjepan Gomboš (1895–1975) Croatian Jewish architect
Zsolt Gombos (1968) Hungarian wrestler who competed in the 1992 Summer Olympics